The 1958 Purdue Boilermakers football team was an American football team that represented Purdue University during the 1958 Big Ten Conference football season In their third season under head coach Jack Mollenkopf, the Boilermakers compiled a 6–1–2 record, finished in fourth place in the Big Ten Conference with a 3–1–2 record against conference opponents, and outscored opponents by a total of 184 to 102.

Purdue tackle Gene Selawski was selected by the Football Writers Association of America as a first-team All-American in 1958. End Tom Franckhauser was selected as a first-team All-American by the Central Press Association. Other notable players included quarterbacks Bob Spoo and Ross Fichtner, fullback Bob Jarus, and guard Ron Maltony.

Schedule

Roster

References

Purdue
Purdue Boilermakers football seasons
Purdue Boilermakers football